Robert or Bobby Baxter may refer to:

 Robert Baxter (MP), member of parliament for Norwich
 Robert Baxter (critic) (1940–2010), American performing-arts critic
 Robert Baxter (executioner) (1878–1961), English hangman
 Bobby Baxter (footballer, born 1911) (1911–1991), Scottish football player
 Bobby Baxter (footballer, born 1937), his son, English footballer
 Robert Baxter of Baxter v. Montana
 Mad Dog (Marvel Comics), a fictional character in the Marvel Comics Universe
 Robert Andrew Baxter (1879–1947), Canadian farmer and politician 
 Robert Dudley Baxter (1827–1875), English economist and statistician